"Hands Up (4 Lovers)" (album version titled "Hands Up for Lovers") is a song by English pop group Right Said Fred, which was released as the second single off their album Sex and Travel.

Track listing
United Kingdom CD single
 "Hands Up (4 Lovers)" (7" Mix)
 "Hands Up (4 Lovers)" (The Morning Mix)
 "Hands Up (4 Lovers)" (The Radio/Club Mix)
 "Bingo"

Chart positions

References

1993 singles
Right Said Fred songs
1993 songs
EMI Records singles
Songs written by Richard Fairbrass
Songs written by Fred Fairbrass
Songs written by Rob Manzoli